Stapleford and Sandiacre railway station served the towns of Stapleford, Nottinghamshire and Sandiacre, Derbyshire, England from 1847 to 1967 on the Erewash Valley Line.

History 
The station opened as Sandiacre and Stapleford on 6 September 1847 by the Midland Railway. It closed on 1 May 1872 but a second station opened on the same day. The second station's name was changed to Stapleford and Sandiacre in 1884. It closed to both passengers and goods traffic on 2 January 1967.

Stationmasters
John Willoughby 1859 - 1865 
Edward Eagle 1865 - ca. 1866 (formerly station master at Croxall, afterwards station master at Langley Mill)
Albert C. Bilham until 1872 (afterwards station master at Ilkeston)
Samuel Hawkins Orchard 1872 - 1906  (formerly stationmaster at Upton on Severn)
George Ward 1906 - 1911 
Alfred Marston 1911 - 1920 (afterwards stationmaster at Beeston)
Charles James Waters 1920 - 1941
S.H. Burditt 1941 - 1950 (formerly stationmaster at Selly Oak)
Harold Anslow ca. 1958 ca. 1967

References

External links 

Disused railway stations in Derbyshire
Railway stations in Great Britain opened in 1847
Railway stations in Great Britain closed in 1967
1847 establishments in England
1967 disestablishments in England
Former Midland Railway stations
Beeching closures in England